Lost in Space is the fourth album by singer-songwriter Aimee Mann, released in 2002 on her own label, SuperEgo Records. A special edition released in 2003 featured a second disc containing six live recordings, two B-sides and two previously unreleased songs.

Mann performed the songs "This Is How It Goes" and "Pavlov's Bell" during a guest appearance on the television show Buffy the Vampire Slayer, in the season seven episode "Sleeper". "Today's the Day" is featured in the 2002 film Enough. The cover and accompanying mini-comic were drawn by Canadian cartoonist Seth.

Reception

Lost in Space holds a score of 74 out of 100 from Metacritic, indicating "generally favorable reviews". E! Online gave the album a B+ and stated, "Mann's cranky muse is consistently compelling, showcasing both her wry lyrics and terrific melodies." Uncut gave the album four stars out of five and called it "textured and complex". Blender also gave it four stars out of five and said the album "pushes [Mann] in a new direction." Q likewise gave it four stars and said that Mann has "returned to writing songs which are wry, funny, adult and perceptive, all wrapped up in handsome melodies." Billboard gave it a positive review and called it "sonically rich" and "home to some of Mann's most intimate storytelling." Neumu.net gave it seven stars out of ten and called it "a rare record that simply responds to the quiet masses who maybe feel just a bit too much too often, and offers them a soothing, downbeat source of comfort without preaching or apology." Mojo gave it a positive review and stated: "Michael Lockwood's production occasionally affects a sound akin to a Vonda Sheppard reared on black dreams and Russian literature."

Other reviews are very average or mixed: Trouser Press gave it an average review and said of Mann, "The songs are not as strong overall as on her previous albums, and the tempo neither flags nor picks up over the course of the album." In his The Village Voice Consumer Guide, Robert Christgau gave it a C+ and said of Mann, "For her fans, the news is that she's invested her profits in studio musicians. Takes talent to make that more boring than solo acoustic, no?" Rolling Stone gave it two stars out of five and said, "The tempos and melodies drag throughout; it's as though we've heard Mann sing these songs before, only here her understated passion comes off more like overstated indifference."

Track listing
All songs written by Aimee Mann, unless otherwise noted.

"Humpty Dumpty" – 4:01
"High on Sunday 51" (Paul Dalen, Mann) – 3:15
"Lost in Space" – 3:28
"This Is How It Goes" – 3:47
"Guys Like Me" – 3:12
"Pavlov's Bell" – 4:27
"Real Bad News" – 3:53
"Invisible Ink" (Mann, Clayton Scoble) – 4:59
"Today's the Day" – 4:42
"The Moth" – 3:46
"It's Not" – 3:27

Special edition disc two tracks
"Real Bad News" (Live from Brussels) – 3:38
"The Moth" (Live from Stockholm) – 3:31
"This Is How It Goes" (Live from Brussels) – 3:38
"The Scientist" (Live from Brussels) – 4:19 (Coldplay cover)
"Invisible Ink" (Live from Brussels) – 5:07
"Nightmare Girl" (B-side) – 3:49
"Backfire" (B-side) – 3:15
"Fighting the Stall" – 4:04
"Observatory" – 4:19
"It's Not" (Live on BBC) – 3:16

Personnel

 Aimee Mann – vocals (1-11), acoustic guitar (1,2,4,5,6,8-11), piano (1,5,9), tambourine (1,3-6,9,10), JX3-P (1), bass (1-5,7-11), paddles (2,10), percussion (2), drum fills (2), backing vocals (2), 12-string acoustic guitar (4,9), electric guitar (5), egg shaker (6), SK-1 (7), handclaps (8), drums (10,11)
 Jay Bellerose – drums (7)
 Jebin Bruni – Chamberlin strings (2), piano (2), Prophet 5 (4)
 Denyse Buffum – viola (8,11)
 Darius Campo – violin (8,11)
 Susan Chatman – violin (8,11)
 Larry Corbett – cello (8,11)
 Mike Denneen – harpsichord (3), electric piano (3), Wurlitzer (3)
 Joel Derouin – violin (8,11)
 Jason Falkner – bass (6)
 Ryan Freeland – AM radio loop (7), handclaps (8)
 Armen Garabedian – violin (8,11)
 Berj Garabedian – violin (8,11)
 Buddy Judge – backing vocals (1-4)
 Suzie Katayama – conductor (8,11)
 Peter Kent – violin (8,11)
 Natalie Leggett – violin (8,11)
 Mario de León – violin (8,11)
 Michael Lockwood – JX3-P (1), Leslie organ (1), slide guitar (1,4,8), electric guitar (1-11), Chamberlin (1,3,6,9,10), autoharp (2), soprano zither (2), Dobro (2), SK-1 (2-4,9-11), baritone guitar (2), B-Bender guitar (3), VL-1 (4), VL-5 (4), 12-string guitar (4), ARP Solina (5), MT-520 (5), Prophet 600 (5,9), harmonium (5), Sonora shakers (5,9), SK-5 (6,7,9-11), MT-65 (6), RS-09 (7), MT-52 (7), CZ-1000 (7), Static (7), Theremin (7), Hohner bass 3 (7), space loop (7), handclaps (8), fun machine (8), Nashville guitar (9), paddles (9), celeste (9), loops (9), 12-string guitar (9), MT-65 E-Bow (9), Mini-Moog (9,10), MT-45 (10), acoustic guitar (10), Omnichord (10), Marxophone (10), SA-9 (11), CS-5 (11)
 Seth McClain – handclaps (8)
 Joe Meyer – French horn (11)
 Carole Mukogawa – viola (8,11)
 Dave Palmer – organ (7)
 Michael Penn – drum loop (2)
 Jonathan Quarmby – horn arrangement (11), string arrangement (8,11)
 Mike Randle – backing vocals (3)
 Michele Richards – violin (8,11)
 Steve Richards – cello (8,11)
 Jeff Rothschild (8)
 Rusty Squeezebox – backing vocals (3)
 Darian Sahanaja – backing vocals (1)
 John Sands – drums (1,3-6,8,9), Sonora shakers (1)
 Daniel Smith – cello (8,11)
 David Stone – double bass (8,11)
 Patrick Warren – Chamberlin strings (4), Chamberlin horns (4), Chamberlin (5,6), Marxophone (5)
 John Wittenberg – violin (8,11)

Sales
By June 2008, the album had sold 232,000 units in the United States according to Nielsen SoundScan.

References

External links
 

Aimee Mann albums
SuperEgo Records albums
2002 albums
Albums produced by Michael Lockwood (guitarist)